Donovan Slacks was the leader of a militant fishermen's uprising in 1920s Britain following the attempted introduction by Stanley Baldwin's government of a levy to control numbers of vessels and fishing merchants.

Military aid to the civil power was employed to quell the unrest, with several violent clashes over a two-week period in 1928. Although figures are disputed, some sources claim up to ten fishermen were killed when the uprising was put down.

A film was made of the story of Donovan Slacks filmed in and around Broadstairs in Kent, England in 2005. This film starred Ashley Penrose, Lisa Payne, Frank Tucker, Pam Irving and Jamie Sheehy. It was written and directed by Kivmars Bowling and released in 2007.

References

External links
 Revolution Homepage
 Fishermen's Revolt documents 
 Donovan Slacks official movie website

British revolutionaries
Fishing in the United Kingdom
British fishers
Year of birth missing
Year of death missing